The Zuni-Cibola Complex is a collection of prehistoric and historic archaeological sites on the Zuni Pueblo in western New Mexico.  It comprises Hawikuh, Yellow House, Kechipbowa, and Great Kivas, all sites of long residence and important in the early Spanish colonial contact period. It was declared a National Historic Landmark District in 1974.  These properties were considered as major elements of a national park, but the proposal was ultimately rejected by the Zuni people.

History

The name "Cibola" first entered recorded history in 1539, when Spaniards in southern New Spain (present day Mexico and Central America) heard rumors that there was a province by this name with "Seven Cities of Gold", located across the desert hundreds of leagues to the north. These rumors were largely caused by reports given by the four shipwrecked survivors of the failed Narváez expedition, including Álvar Núñez Cabeza de Vaca and an African slave named Esteban Dorantes, or Estevanico. Upon finally returning to New Spain, the adventurers said they had heard stories from Natives about cities with great and limitless riches.

Upon hearing the castaways' tales, Viceroy Antonio de Mendoza organized an expedition headed by the Franciscan friar Marcos de Niza, who took Estevanico as his guide. During the voyage, in a place called Vacapa (probably located somewhere around the state of Sonora), de Niza sent Estevanico to scout ahead. A short while later, Estevanico met a monk who had heard stories from the Natives about seven cities called "Cibola", said to be overflowing with riches. Estevanico did not wait for the friar, but instead continued travelling until he reached Cibola (Háwikuh, now in New Mexico), where, at the hands of the Zuni tribe, he met his death, and his companions were forced to flee.

Marcos de Niza returned to Mexico City and said that the expedition had continued even after the death of Estevanico. He claimed that they had seen Cíbola from a great distance, and that it was larger than Tenochtitlan; in this city, the people used dishes of gold and silver, decorated their houses with turquoise, and had gigantic pearls, emeralds, and other beautiful gems. It is now believed by some historians that the mica-inflected clay of the adobe pueblos may have created an optical illusion when inflamed by the setting sun, thus fuelling the tale.

Upon hearing this news, the Viceroy de Mendoza wasted no time in organizing a large military expedition to take possession of the riches that the monk had described with such vivid detail. Upon the Viceroy's command, Francisco Vázquez de Coronado began his expedition, taking the friar Marcos de Niza as his guide. Coronado left with a small group of explorers from Culiacán on April 22, 1540.

When Coronado arrived at Hawikuh pueblo, which the chroniclers called Cevola, Tzibola, or Cibola, he discovered that Marcos de Niza's stories were lies, and that there were in fact no treasures as the friar had described. He also found that, contrary to the friar's account, the sea was not within view from that region, but it was instead many days' journey away. Nevertheless, Coronado occupied the region by military force and used it as a base for future explorations.

Sites
The Zuni Pueblo has a large number of archaeological sites, and was considered in the early 1970s as a site for a major national cultural park, based on a subset of those sites that are larger and suitable for public access.  The stated intent was to preserve and stabilize the archaeological properties, and to properly interpret them for visitors to the region.  Congress authorized enabling legislation in 1988, but the proposal foundered when the people of Zuni Pueblo overwhelmingly voted against leasing land to the National Park Service for the project.  The park proposal included four major elements, described below, all of which are located on Zuni reservation lands.

Yellow House
Yellow House, known in Zuni as "Heshotathluptsina", is located east of Zuni near the mouth of Horsehead Canyon.  In the early 1970s, it was largely unimproved and unexcavated, surveys indicated it was probably a late prehistoric habitation (c. 14th century CE), although there was also evidence of possible earlier use.  The site's location was considered suitable as a contact site for the proposed national park, due to its proximity to New Mexico State Road 53.

Hawikuh

Hawikuh was one of the largest settlements in the Zuni territory at the time of Coronado's 1540 expedition. Spanish control over Hawikuh in the 17th century was always tenuous, and it was abandoned after the 1680 Pueblo Rebellion.

Kechipbowa
It is a multifaceted site, including structures associated with occupation during the 15th and 16th centuries, but also with remains that are likely older, and the remains of another 17th-century Spanish mission church.

Great Kivas
The site includes three major room complexes and two very large kivas.

See also

National Register of Historic Places listings in Cibola County, New Mexico
National Register of Historic Places listings in McKinley County, New Mexico
List of National Historic Landmarks in New Mexico

References

External links
The journey of Coronado, 1540-1542, from the city of Mexico to the Grand Canon of the Colorado and the buffalo plains of Texas, Kansas and Nebraska, as told by himself and his followers - Complete primary documents pertaining to Coronado's expeditions, translated by George Parker Winship, at Portal to Texas History.
Zuni-Cibola National Historical Park, the Park that Died A-Borning, National Parks Traveler, June 28, 2009
Journal of Marco de Nicas Translation of Marco de Nicas' (Niza) 1539 journal of his visit to Ceuola (Cibola) where Stephan (Estevanico) was killed.
Journal of Alvar Nunez Translation of the journal of the 9 years Alvar Nunez spent wandering from Florida to the Pacific during the failed Narváez expedition.

Sources
 Crampton, C. Gregory. The Zunis of Cibola. Salt Lake City: University of Utah Press, 1977.

National Historic Landmarks in New Mexico
Buildings and structures in Cibola County, New Mexico
Buildings and structures in McKinley County, New Mexico
History of Valencia County, New Mexico
History of Cibola County, New Mexico
History of McKinley County, New Mexico
Puebloan buildings and structures
Archaeological sites on the National Register of Historic Places in New Mexico
Historic districts on the National Register of Historic Places in New Mexico
National Register of Historic Places in Cibola County, New Mexico
National Register of Historic Places in McKinley County, New Mexico
Zuni culture